Neil Schyan Jeffers (born March 22, 1977) is an Antigua and Barbudan football player. He plays for Antigua and Barbuda national team.

National team statistics

References

1977 births
Living people
Antigua and Barbuda footballers
Antigua and Barbuda international footballers
Association football defenders
Place of birth missing (living people)